Kinsela may refer to:

People
John Kinsela (1950–2020), Australian-indigenous wrestler and officer

Character
Damon Kinsela, from Hollyoaks

See also
Kinsella